"Strap on the Side" is a song by American rapper Spice 1 from his 1994 album AmeriKKKa's Nightmare . The song peaked at #74 on the Hot R&B/Hip-Hop Singles & Tracks chart. In addition to an official maxi-single, a music video was released in 1994. The video features a cameo appearance by 2Pac. The song was later included on Spice 1's second greatest hits' album, Hits II: Ganked & Gaffled (2001).

Charts

References

1994 songs
1994 singles
Spice 1 songs
Jive Records singles
Songs written by Lonnie Simmons
Songs written by Charlie Wilson (singer)
Songs written by Rudy Taylor